This list of British Vogue cover models 1950–present is a catalogue of cover models who have featured on the cover of British Vogue.

1940s

1950s

1960s

1970s

1980s

1990s

2000s

2010s

2020s

External links
British Vogue cover archive - Official Site

British
Vogue
British fashion
British Vogue